Sam Douglas (born Douglas Samuel Waters; 17 June 1957) is a British actor best known for his role as private detective Scott Shelby in the PlayStation 3 video game Heavy Rain, as King Herod in The Bible miniseries for the History Channel, and as Rosebud in the movie Snatch. He has had several other roles in films, television, commercials, and on stage.

Education
He received a Bachelor of Fine Arts in acting from Simpson College, Iowa, and in directing from the Oklahoma City University School of Drama. At both places of study he was under the tutorship of Alan Langdon.

Theatre
He has played in several theatres in US and UK such as the Royal National Theatre, Greenwich Theatre, Royal Court Theatre and Savoy Theatre. Some of the plays include: Edmond at the Royal Court Theatre, London; A Raisin in the Sun and Porgy and Bess at the Savoy Theatre; The Darker Face of the Earth and  A Streetcar Named Desire at the Royal National Theatre in London; and On The Waterfront with Steven Berkoff. Sam Douglas is also a Theatre Director from the Actors Space in New York and runs professional method acting workshops in London and Oxford, based on the Stanislavski's system under Alan Langdon at the Circle in the Square Theatre in New York City.

Filmography

Film

Television

Video games

References

External links

 
 Heavy Rain official website

1957 births
Living people
English male film actors
English male television actors
English male voice actors
English male video game actors
American male film actors
American male television actors
American male voice actors
American male stage actors
American male video game actors
English emigrants to the United States
People from Banbury
Simpson College alumni
Oklahoma City University alumni